Liam Gordon might refer to:

Liam Gordon (footballer, born 1996), Scottish footballer
Liam Gordon (footballer, born 1999), English-Guyanese footballer